The 1947 Titleholders Championship was contested from March 27–30 at Augusta Country Club. It was the 8th edition of the Titleholders Championship.

This event was won by Babe Zaharias.

Round summaries

First round

Second round

Third round

Final round

External links
The Evening Independent first round source
The News and Courier first round source
Youngstown Vindicator second round source
The Sunday Morning Star third round source
The Milwaukee Sentinel fourth round source
Schenectady Gazette fourth round source
The Tuscaloosa News fourth round source

Titleholders Championship
Golf in Georgia (U.S. state)
Titleholders Championship
Titleholders Championship
Titleholders
Titleholders Championship
Women's sports in Georgia (U.S. state)